Bahman Forsi (born 1 February 1934) is an Iranian Azerbaijanis  playwright who was born in Tabriz but immigrated to Tehran when he was four years old. At first he worked for newspapers and wrote several poems, short stories and reviews; he started to write plays afterwards. His first play was The Vase (1960). He was influenced by European absurdist theater, and therefore attempted to use a completely new language in his plays, described as novel for Iranian drama in the 1960s.

Selected plays 
 The Vase (1960)
 The Mouse (1963)
 Rungs of a Ladder (1963)
 Green in Green (1964)
 Spring and a Doll (1964)
 Two Times Two Is Infinity (1968)
 Breaking Sound (1971)
 Asylum (1977)

Short story collections 
 In the Dog's Teeth (1964)
 First Night, Second Night (1964)
 Twelfth (1991)
 Free Fall (1991)
 The Black Rock Candy (1992)

References

1934 births
Living people
People from Tabriz
Iranian male poets
Iranian male film actors
Iranian male short story writers
Iranian dramatists and playwrights